Ypsolopha lonicerella is a moth of the family Ypsolophidae. It is known to be found in the eastern part of the Carpathian Mountains.

The wingspan is about 18–20 mm.

References

External links
lepiforum.de

Ypsolophidae
Moths of Europe